Guaranty Trust Bank (Rwanda) plc, commonly referred to as GTBank Rwanda, is one of the licensed commercial banks in the Republic of Rwanda.  It has been part of Nigerian Guaranty Trust Bank since 2013.

, Guaranty Trust Bank (Rwanda) plc had an estimated asset base of US$ 131.309million (RWF:132.571billion).

History
The beginnings of the bank in Rwanda can be traced to 1983, when the BACAR bank was established. It became one of the first privately owned commercial banks in the country. Sometime before 2004, BACAR was taken over by the National Bank of Rwanda, the country's central bank, because of managerial issues. In 2004, Fina Bank, at that time, a Kenyan commercial bank, acquired BACAR. In 2008, Fina Bank opened banking operations in Uganda as well, forming the Fina Bank Group. 

In 2013, Guaranty Trust Bank (Kenya) ltd acquired 70 percent shareholding in the Fina Bank Group for a cash payment of US$100 million. In January 2014, the bank rebranded to reflect the new ownership structure.

Branch network
As of December 2022, GTBank Rwanda maintained branches at the following locations:
 Main Branch - KN 2 Ave, 1370, MIC Building Kigali
 Gisozi Branch - Gasabo, Kigali
 Muhanga Branch - Muhanga, Southern Province
 Kayonza Branch - Kayonza, Eastern Province
 Ngoma Branch - Ngoma, Eastern Province
 Karongi Branch - Karongi, Western Province
 Kicukiro Branch - Kicukiro, Kigali
 Kigali City Market Branch -  Nyarugenge, Kigali
 Kimironko Branch - Gasabo Kigali
 Nyabugogo Branch - Nyarugenge, Kigali
 Remera Branch - Gasabo, Kigali
 Rubavu Branch - , Rubavu, Northern Province
 Musanze Branch - Musanze, Northern Province
 Rusizi Branch - Rusizi, Western Province

See also

 List of banks in Rwanda
 Economy of Rwanda
 Guaranty Trust Bank (Uganda)
 Guaranty Trust Bank (Kenya)
 Fina Bank Group

References

Banks of Rwanda
Banks established in 2004
2004 establishments in Rwanda
Organisations based in Kigali
Economy of Kigali